"Antichrist", or Anticristo, was a Spanish-language computer virus hoax distributed via email in 2001.

Email contents
The email was detected by Symantec on July 17, 2001. The Spanish text of the email translates to
ALERT: THE WORST VIRUS IN HISTORY.
A new virus has just been discovered that has been classified by Microsoft and Mcafee as the most destructive of all time. This virus was discovered yesterday and is known by the name of ANTICHRIST; no antivirus has been discovered; it simply destroys the zeroth sector of the hard disk, where vital information for its operation is kept.
It works in the following way:
1. -) It sends itself to all the names in your address book with the title:
"SURPRISE?!!!!!!!!!!"
2. -) As soon as it is installed, it destroys the zeroth sector and in this way it permanently destroys the hard disk. Please send this E-mail to as many people as you can; in case you receive an e-mail with subject "SURPRISE?!!!!!!!!!!!!!!!!!!!!!!!!!!", get advice from an expert because it can install itself automatically.

References

Virus hoaxes
2001 hoaxes